We Made This Ourselves is the first album by Essie Jain.  The album was released by Ba Da Bing in 2007.

The New York Times wrote that "Ms. Jain builds stark miniatures out of a few light strums of guitar and her haunting alto. On her captivating new album, We Made This Ourselves, her voice is multitracked in precise harmonies that can be warm or ghostly."

Track listing 
All tracks composed by Essie Jain
"Glory"
"Haze"
"Sailor"
"Talking"
"Indefinable"
"Grace"
"Give"
"Understand"
"Loaded"
"No Mistake"

External links
 at Pitchfork Media

2007 debut albums
The Leaf Label albums